Thoracic aperture may refer to:

 Thoracic inlet
 Thoracic outlet